Jesse Shattuck Jones (March 21, 1860 – November 7, 1931) was an American politician in the state of Washington. He served in the Washington State Senate. From 1907 to 1909, he was President pro tempore of the Senate. In 1894, Jones moved to Tacoma, Washington and was involved in business. He served on the Tacoma City Council and served as president of the city council.

References

Republican Party Washington (state) state senators
Washington (state) city council members
1860 births
1931 deaths
People from Aurora, Indiana
Politicians from Tacoma, Washington